Drought is common in Turkey, especially in the south and center of the country, with 2021 being the driest in 2 decades. Droughts are forecast to occur more frequently due to climate change, and 2023 began with drought. Most water loss is due to poor irrigation. In 2022 the World Bank said that “without reform, a 10% fall in water supply in Türkiye could reduce GDP by 6%”.

Climate

Weather patterns 
Most of the climate of Turkey in the interior is a semi-arid climate and on the south and west coasts a Mediterranean climate which are characterized by summer drought. Turkey's climate is affected by the  North Atlantic oscillation (NAO), the Mediterranean  Circulation  Index, and the Southern Oscillation Index.

Climate change 

Due to climate change, extreme droughts and water scarcity are predicted to increase, for example in Ankara Province.

Geography 

Parts of the country are arid or becoming arid. Between 1931 and 2010 extreme drought occurred in 3% of the country, severe drought in 4% and moderate drought in 7%. The lowest precipitation in Turkey is around Lake Tuz at around 35 cm per year.

Major droughts 
Severe droughts were experienced in 1804, 1876, 1928, and often since the 1970s.

Recent severe droughts

2007–2008 
Between December 2006 and December 2008 there was significantly less winter and autumn precipitation. Hydrological, agricultural and socioeconomic droughts developed due to the meteorological drought. Loss of agricultural products, insufficiency of above ground and underground water, insufficiency and cuts in drinking water in big cities such as Ankara and Istanbul were observed. The drought mostly affected the Aegean, Marmara, Mediterranean and Central Anatolia regions. Drinking water was supplied from the Kızılırmak River to Ankara and from Melen Stream to Istanbul.

2013–2014 
The 2012 Eastern and Central Anatolia drought combined with the summer drought of the Mediterranean Climate, was experienced as a moderate and severe drought in most of the country in 2013. The total amount of precipitation between 1 October 2013 and 17 January 2014 was about half of the same period in the previous year and 37% below the long-term average.

2020–2021 

Precipitation was below average from mid-2019, and particularly the second half of 2020, and the drought mainly impacted agriculture in Turkey, because big city reservoirs received rain before they ran out.

Desertification risk 

More than 60% (51.5 mil. ha) of environmentally sensitive areas are fragile and critical.

Agriculture 
Grain in Konya Province is affected Almost three-quarters of the water supply is used for irrigation and most water loss is due to poor irrigation, and more widespread use of drip irrigation has been suggested.

Water resources 
There are about 1500 cubic metres per person per year. Precipitation can be measured by satellite.

Other uses of water 
Hydroelectricity in Turkey is reduced by climate change. According to the Water Policy Association half of water intended for taps is lost to leaks. According to TEMA 4 million tons a day are consumed for coal mining.

Officially sanctioned methods to combat drought include better protecting river basins, building underground dams, rainwater harvesting, use of grey water and praying for rain.

References

External links

Further reading 
 

Droughts in Turkey
Climate change in Turkey